Lebanon first competed at the Asian Games in 1978.

Medal tables

Medals by Asian Games

References